Kullabergs vingård is a vineyard located in Höganäs Municipality, Skåne County, Sweden Kullabergs vingård produces wine, cider and distillates from estate grown grapes and fruit. The property is a part of the Balderup estate.
Winemaker is K Felix G Åhrberg, oenologist from Klosterneuburg in Austria.
The oldest field is 2 ha big, planted in 2006, containing the varieties Solaris, Regent and Rondo. In 2017, 7 ha were planted with Solaris and the new varieties Souvignier gris, Muscaris and Donauriesling. During 2019 a further 4 ha were planted with blue varieties Pinot Nova and Cabernet Noir. The vineyard is entirely planted with fungi resistant so-called PIWI varieties allowing sustainable viticulture without pesticides and herbicides.
In Sweden, the products are sold through Systembolaget.

See also
Swedish wine

References

External links
Kullabergs vingårds website

Agriculture in Sweden
Swedish wine
Companies based in Skåne County
Vineyards